Gymnophthalmus is genus of lizards in the family Gymnophthalmidae. The genus is native to Mexico, Central America, and the northern part of South America. Eight species are recognized as being valid.

Species
The genus Gymnophthalmus contains the following species.
Gymnophthalmus cryptus  – cryptic spectacled tegu
Gymnophthalmus leucomystax  – white spectacled tegu
Gymnophthalmus lineatus 
Gymnophthalmus marconaterai 
Gymnophthalmus pleii  – Martinique spectacled tegu, rough-scaled worm lizard
Gymnophthalmus speciosus  – golden spectacled tegu
Gymnophthalmus underwoodi  – Underwood's spectacled tegu
Gymnophthalmus vanzoi

References

Further reading
Boulenger GA (1885). Catalogue of the Lizards in the British Museum (Natural History). Second Edition. Volume II. ... Teiidæ .... London: Trustees of the British Museum (Natural History). (Taylor and Francis, printers). xiii + 497 pp. + Plates I-XXIV. (Genus Gymnophthalmus, p. 427).
Merrem B (1820). Versuchs eines Systems der Amphibien: Tentamen Systematis Amphibiorum. Marburg: J.C. Krieger. xv + 191 pp. + one plate. (Gymnophthalmus, new genus, p. 74). (in German and Latin).

External links

 
Lizard genera
Taxa named by Blasius Merrem